HMS Winchester was a 50-gun fourth rate ship of the line of the Royal Navy, built by Richard Wells at Greenland North Dockyard, Rotherhithe and launched on 17 March 1698.

She was rebuilt to the 1706 Establishment at Plymouth Dockyard, and was relaunched on 10 October 1717. Winchester was hulked in 1744, and served in this role until 1781, when she was broken up.

She was captained from 1712 to 1714 by Sir Tancred Robinson.

Notes

References

Lavery, Brian (2003) The Ship of the Line – Volume 1: The development of the battlefleet 1650–1850. Conway Maritime Press. .

Ships of the line of the Royal Navy
1690s ships
Ships built in Rotherhithe
Ships built in Plymouth, Devon